Mike Rohrkaste (born September 24, 1958) is an American businessman and politician.  A Republican, he was a member of the Wisconsin State Assembly from 2015 to 2021, representing Neenah, Grand Chute, and northeast Winnebago County.

Early life
Born in Dayton, Ohio, Rohrkaste graduated from Chaminade-Julienne High School in Dayton. He received his bachelor's degree in social science and master's degree in labor and industrial relations from Michigan State University.

Career
Rohrkaste moved to Neenah, Wisconsin, in 1994. He worked for Miller Brewing Company, Menasha Corporation, and Oshkosh Corporation, before retiring from Oshkosh Corporation in 2014 as Chief Human Resources Officer. That same year, on November 4, Rohrkaste was elected to the Wisconsin State Assembly. He was re-elected in 2016 and 2018, but is not seeking re-election in 2020.

References

External links
 Representative Mike Rohrkaste at Wisconsin Legislature
 
 

1958 births
Living people
Politicians from Dayton, Ohio
Politicians from Neenah, Wisconsin
Michigan State University alumni
Businesspeople from Wisconsin
21st-century American politicians
Republican Party members of the Wisconsin State Assembly